The Academy At Shotton Hall is a coeducational secondary school in Peterlee, County Durham, England. It is a school for 11- to 16-year-olds and is a specialist Performing Arts College it was renamed from Shotton Hall School in February 2011. The school has recently undergone major renovation work as part of the Government's Building Schools for the Future (BSF) program. The work has seen the school completely rebuilt and the old school buildings were demolished. The current head teacher at the school is Lesley Powell. Previous head teacher, Ian Mowbray, retired In July 2010.

History
Shotton Hall School was first opened in 1900 as a secondary modern school, but in 1973 it became a comprehensive school and it was extended with new buildings such as the B block, the Towers, Speed, Metcalfe and Nicholson house blocks, the art block, the music block and the sports hall. The school was granted Specialist Performing Arts College status in 2003. Recently, the school has applied for "Fast track academy" Status and on 1 February 2011, was renamed The Academy At Shotton Hall.

New School Development
Workers finished the construction work in December 2010, and as a result. The school Christmas holidays were extended by 2 weeks.
The new schools features the same extensive performing arts equipment as there was in the old school, but most of it has either been replaced or improved in some way. The school was very lucky for the building of the new school to not have been scrapped, as many were as a result of the scrapping of the BSF project by the government. The old school buildings were demolished between May and July 2011.

Performance
GCSE results at the school have continued to improve and in 2009, 98% of students taking GCSEs achieved 5 or more grades A* to C, making it the second best performing school in County Durham and one of the 30 most improved schools nationally. Shotton Hall was also judged as an 'outstanding' school in its most recent OFSTED inspection (full inspection report can be read by clicking on the OFSTED number on the right).

The school has a wide range of performing arts facilities including a hall with an extensive and professional lighting system, a dance studio, a drama studio and a professional recording studio. The school currently has a performing arts website which was launched on 1 January 2009.

Pupils
J. P. E. Harper-Scott musicologist and professor at Royal Holloway, University of London studied when the college was a comprehensive school.

The singer Courtney Hadwin attended the school.

The actor Connor Lawson actor who played Alex Walker in The Dumping Ground and Billy Elliot in the West End attended the school.

Footballer Chris Brown also attended the school.

References

1963 establishments in England
Academies in County Durham
Educational institutions established in 1963
Peterlee
Secondary schools in County Durham